Sir Henry Clithering is a fictional character who appears in a series of short stories by Agatha Christie, featuring Jane Marple.  The stories were first published in monthly magazines starting in 1927, and then collected into a hard-bound collection, The Thirteen Problems in 1932.  Clithering also appeared in several novels featuring Miss Marple.

Overview
He is a retired Scotland Yard commissioner and his godson Dermot Eric Craddock is eventually a detective inspector at Scotland Yard. 

Whenever local police warn Miss Marple not to interfere in an investigation, Sir Henry supports Marple. He recommends her to the county police trying to solve the crime in A Murder Is Announced, connecting Miss Marple to Sir Henry’s godson, Detective Inspector Dermott Craddock, then working for the Chief Constable in the county. This is the first time Miss Marple and Detective Inspector Dermott Craddock worked together.

In the novel The Mirror Crack'd from Side to Side, Craddock has been promoted to Chief Inspector in Scotland Yard.

List of appearances

Short stories
The Tuesday Night Club
The Idol House of Astarte
Ingots of Gold
The Blood-Stained Pavement
Motive v. Opportunity
The Thumb Mark of St. Peter
The Blue Geranium
The Companion
The Four Suspects
A Christmas Tragedy
The Herb of Death
The Affair at the Bungalow
Death by Drowning

Novels
The Murder at the Vicarage
The Body in the Library
A Murder is Announced
A Pocket Full of Rye
4.50 from Paddington
Nemesis (mentioned)

In other media

Television
 Raymond Francis portrayed Sir Henry in the adaptation of The Body in the Library for the BBC's series Agatha Christie's Miss Marple in 1984.
 The Blue Geranium was adapted for Agatha Christie's Marple in 2010 with Donald Sinden playing Sir Henry.

Radio
Graham Crowden voiced Sir Henry in the 1999 BBC Radio dramatisations of The Body in the Library and A Murder is Announced''.

References

Literary characters introduced in 1927
Agatha Christie characters
Fictional British police officers